Opisthotropis cucae, Cuc's mountain snake, is a species of natricine snake found in Vietnam.

References

Opisthotropis
Reptiles described in 2011
Reptiles of Vietnam